John Sedgwick (September 13, 1813 – May 9, 1864) was a military officer and Union Army general during the American Civil War.

He was wounded three times at the Battle of Antietam while leading his division in an unsuccessful assault against Confederate forces, causing him to miss the Battle of Fredericksburg. Under his command, the VI Corps played an important role in the Chancellorsville Campaign by engaging Confederate troops at the Second Battle of Fredericksburg and the Battle of Salem Church. His corps was the last to arrive at the Battle of Gettysburg and thus did not see much action. Sedgwick was killed by a sharpshooter at the Battle of Spotsylvania Court House on May 9, 1864, making him and Major Generals James B. McPherson, Joseph K. Mansfield, and John F. Reynolds the highest-ranking Union officers to be killed in the war. He is remembered for an ironic remark among his last words: "They couldn't hit an elephant at this distance."

Early life and education 
Sedgwick was born in the Litchfield Hills town of Cornwall, Connecticut. He was named after his grandfather, John Sedgwick (brother of Theodore Sedgwick), an American Revolutionary War general who served with George Washington. He attended Sharon Academy for 2 years and Cheshire Academy in 1830–31. After teaching for two years, he attended the United States Military Academy, graduated in 1837 ranked 24th of 50, and was commissioned a second lieutenant in the U.S. Army's artillery branch. He fought in the Seminole Wars and received two brevet promotions in the Mexican–American War, to captain for Contreras and Churubusco, and to major for Chapultepec. After returning from Mexico, he was promoted to the permanent rank of captain in 1849 and replaced James Duncan as commander of Battery A, 2nd U.S. Artillery. In March 1855, Sedgwick accepted a transfer promotion to the rank of major with the United States Cavalry. He served in Kansas, in the Utah War, and in the Indian Wars, participating during 1857 in a punitive expedition against the Cheyenne.

In the summer and fall of 1860, Sedgwick commanded an expedition to establish a new fort on the Platte River in what is now Colorado. This was a remote location with no railroads, and all supplies having to be carried long distances by riverboat, wagon train or horseback. Even though many of these supplies failed to arrive, Sedgwick still managed to erect comfortable stone buildings for his men before the cold weather set in.

American Civil War 

At the start of the American Civil War, Sedgwick was serving as a colonel and assistant inspector general of the Military Department of Washington. He missed the early action of the war at the First Battle of Bull Run, recovering from cholera. Promoted to brigadier general on August 31, 1861, he commanded the 2nd brigade of Maj. Gen. Samuel P. Heintzelman's division in the Army of the Potomac, then his own division, which was designated the 2nd division of the II Corps for the Peninsula Campaign. In Virginia, he fought at Yorktown and Seven Pines. During the Seven Days Battles, Sedgwick's division fought at Savage's Station and Glendale, being wounded in the latter engagement. After the Seven Days Battles, he was promoted to major general. The II Corps and Sedgwick's division were not involved in the Northern Virginia Campaign.

In the Battle of Antietam, II Corps commander Maj. Gen. Edwin V. Sumner impulsively sent Sedgwick's division in a mass assault without proper reconnaissance. His division was engaged by Confederate forces under Maj. Gen. Thomas J. "Stonewall" Jackson from three sides, was routed, and fell back with barely half the men it had started with. Sedgwick himself was shot three times, in the wrist, leg, and shoulder, and was out of action until after the Battle of Fredericksburg.

From December 26, 1862, he briefly led the II Corps and the IX Corps, and then finally the VI Corps of the Army of the Potomac, which he commanded until his death in 1864. During the Second Battle of Fredericksburg, his corps faced Fredericksburg in an initial holding action while Maj. Gen. Joseph Hooker's other four corps maneuvered against Robert E. Lee's left flank (10 miles east at Chancellorsville). Sedgwick was slow to take action, but eventually crossed the Rappahannock River and assaulted Maj. Gen. Jubal Early's small force on Marye's Heights on May 3 during the Second Battle of Fredericksburg. Moving west slowly to join forces with Hooker and trap Lee between the halves of the army, he was stopped by elements of Lee's Second Corps (under Maj. Gen. J.E.B. Stuart, following the wounding of Jackson) at the Battle of Salem Church, forcing his eventual retreat back over the Rappahannock.

At the Battle of Gettysburg, his corps arrived late on July 2, and as a result only a few units were able to take part in the final Union counterattacks in the Wheatfield. It was not kept together as a unit during the second and third days of the battle, its brigades scattered around to plug holes in the line. While much of Sedgwick's VI Corps was held in reserve at Gettysburg, it performed exceptionally at the Second Battle of Rappahannock Station in November, capturing four field pieces, eight stands of enemy colors and 1,700 prisoners.

Prior to the start of the Overland Campaign in the spring of 1864, George Meade reorganized the Army of the Potomac and dropped several underperforming generals. Sedgwick narrowly missed the chopping block, being that he was unpopular with Secretary of War Edwin Stanton for being a vocal admirer of departed Army of the Potomac commander George McClellan and for having shown insufficient enthusiasm for abolitionism and the Radical Republican platform. Sedgwick had also made enemies among the Radical Republicans by criticizing General Benjamin Butler, one of their favorites. Meade, realizing this, proposed reassigning Sedgwick to command in the Shenandoah Valley. Sedgwick himself acknowledged that he was war-weary by this point and would have welcomed reassignment to a post where not much fighting was expected. In a letter to his sister, he said that he could gladly leave the army without regret and wished to come home to New England. In the end however, General Franz Sigel got the Shenandoah Valley command, which ended up being a much more active theater in 1864 than anyone expected, and Sedgwick remained in command of the VI Corps.

In the Overland Campaign, the VI Corps was on the Union right at the Battle of the Wilderness and defended against assaults by Lt. Gen. Richard S. Ewell's Second Corps.

Death 
Sedgwick died at the beginning of the Battle of Spotsylvania Court House, on May 9, 1864. His corps was probing skirmish lines ahead of the left flank of Confederate defenses and he was directing artillery placements. Sedgwick strode around in the open and was quoted as saying, "What? Men dodging this way for single bullets? What will you do when they open fire along the whole line?" Although ashamed, his men continued to flinch and he said, "Why are you dodging like this? They couldn't hit an elephant at this distance." Reports that he never finished the sentence are apocryphal, although the line was among his last words. He was shot by a Whitworth rifle bullet moments later under the left eye and mortally wounded. His chief of staff Martin T. McMahon said that the sharpshooters' bullets were flying all around, making whistling noises, and "The same shrill whistle closing with a dull, heavy stroke interrupted me, and I remember distinctly that I commenced to say 'General, they are firing explosive bullets.' when his face turned slowly to me, and blood spurting from his left cheek under the eye in a steady stream, brought to me the first knowledge of our great disaster. He fell in my direction and I was so close to him that my effort to support him failed, and I went to the ground with him." Corps medical personnel were immediately summoned, but Sedgwick never regained consciousness and continued to bleed out for some time, until his hair was soaked with blood.

Sedgwick was the highest-ranking Union death in the Civil War. Although Major General James B. McPherson was in command of an army at the time of his death and Sedgwick of a corps, Sedgwick had the most senior rank by date of all major generals killed. Upon hearing of his death, Lt. Gen. Ulysses S. Grant, flabbergasted by the news, repeatedly asked, "Is he really dead?"

Legacy 

Sedgwick's reputation was that of a solid, dependable, but relatively unaggressive general. He was well liked by his soldiers, who referred to him affectionately as "Uncle John". His death was met by universal sorrow; even Robert E. Lee expressed his sadness over the fate of an old friend. George G. Meade wept at the news. Meade had recently quarreled with Sedgwick for being over-reliant on fellow corps commander Gouverneur Warren for advice, and said of him "I wish we could have parted on better terms." Ulysses S. Grant characterized Sedgwick as one who "was never at fault when serious work was to be done" and he told his staff that the loss for him was worse than that of an entire division.

Sedgwick is buried near his birthplace of Cornwall Hollow, Connecticut. An equestrian statue honors him and the VI Corps at Gettysburg National Military Park.

There is a monument of General Sedgwick at West Point. Academy legend has it that a cadet who spins the rowels of the spurs on boots of the statue at midnight while wearing full parade dress gray over white uniform under arms will have good luck on his or her final exam.

The following were named in his honor:
 Sedgwick, Colorado
 Sedgwick County, Colorado
 Sedgwick, Kansas
 Sedgwick County, Kansas
 Fort Sedgwick was one of the forts of the Union siege line in the Siege of Petersburg 1864–65.
 Camp Rankin was renamed Fort Sedgwick in 1865, near Julesburg, Colorado.

A major street in the Bronx, New York City is named after him.  An east–west street in Washington, D.C., near American University, is also named in his honor, as is another on Chicago's near north side, with a CTA station named after the street. Grand Army of the Republic Post #4 in Keene, New Hampshire; Post #12 in Milwaukee, Wisconsin; Post #17 in Santa Ana, California; and Post #37 in York, Pennsylvania, are all named after him. Also, a junior high-school (John Sedgwick Middle School "Home of the Generals") in Port Orchard, Washington, was named after him.

Farley, his headquarters at the time of the Battle of Brandy Station, was listed on the National Register of Historic Places in 1976.

See also 

 List of American Civil War generals (Union)

Footnotes

Citations 

References

 Berthrong, Donald J. The Southern Cheyenne. Norman: University of Oklahoma Press, 1979. 
 Eicher, John H., and David J. Eicher. Civil War High Commands. Stanford, CA: Stanford University Press, 2001. .
 Foote, Shelby. The Civil War: A Narrative. vol. 3, Red River to Appomattox. New York: Random House, 1974. .
 Grinnell, George Bird. The Fighting Cheyennes. Norman: University of Oklahoma Press, 1956. . First published 1915 by Charles Scribner's Sons.
 Jurgen, Robert J., and Allan Keller. Major General John Sedgwick, U.S. Volunteers, 1813–1864. Hartford: Connecticut Civil War Centennial Committee, 1963.
 Rhea, Gordon C. The Battles for Spotsylvania Court House and the Road to Yellow Tavern May 7–12, 1864. Baton Rouge: Louisiana State University Press, 1997. .
 Sifakis, Stewart. Who Was Who In The Civil War. New York: Facts on File, 1988. .
 Winslow, Richard Elliott. General John Sedgwick: The Story of a Union Corps Commander. Novato, CA: Presidio Press, 1982. .

External links 

 Death of General John Sedgwick
 Short biographical sketch
 Another short bio
 Tribute site
 

1813 births
1864 deaths
American military personnel of the Mexican–American War
American people of English descent
American people of the Seminole Wars
Deaths by firearm in Virginia
Military personnel from Connecticut
People from Cornwall, Connecticut
People of Connecticut in the American Civil War
Sedgwick family
Union Army generals
Union military personnel killed in the American Civil War
United States Military Academy alumni